Olenus or Olenos was a town of ancient Galatia, in the west of Ancyra, and belonging to the territory of the Tectosages, is mentioned only by Ptolemy.

References

Populated places in ancient Galatia
Former populated places in Turkey
Lost ancient cities and towns